Kalliapseudidae is a family of crustaceans belonging to the order Tanaidacea.

Genera

Genera:
 Acutihumerus Gutu, 2006
 Bacescapseudes Gutu, 1981
 Cristapseudes Bacescu, 1980

References

Tanaidacea